Haplodesmidae is a family of millipedes in the order Polydesmida. Species occur in East Asia, Southeast Asia, and Oceania, although some species have been introduced to the New world tropics. Species are small bodied (generally less than 10 mm), often with elaborate sculpturing on the tergites (dorsal portion of exoskeleton), and some species are capable of rolling into a near-complete ball.

This family includes some species that feature unusual deviations from the 20 segments (including the telson) normally observed in the order Polydesmida. For example, some species exhibit sexual dimorphism in segments number, including not only Prosopodesmus panporus and Eutrichodesmus peculiaris (adult females with the usual 20 segments, but adult males with only 19) but also Doratodesmus pholeter (adults females with 19 segments, adult males with 18). This family also includes two species notable for being among the few species in Polydesmida to feature only 18 segments in adults (both sexes in D. hispidus and males only in D. pholeter). Species arrive at these lower numbers of segments by going through the same stages of teloanamorphosis observed in other polydesmids but reaching maturity one moult earlier for 19 segments or two moults earlier for 18 segments.

Genera
Agathodesmus
Atopogonus
Cylindrodesmus
Doratodesmus
Eutrichodesmus
Gonomastis
Helodesmus
Prosopodesmus

References

Polydesmida
Millipedes of Asia
Millipedes of Oceania
Millipede families